140 may refer to:

 140 (number), an integer
 AD 140, a year of the Julian calendar
 140 BC, a year of the pre-Julian Roman calendar
 140 (video game), a 2013 platform game
 Tin King stop, MTR digital station code

See also  
 140th (disambiguation)